The 2006 Pan American Judo Championships were held in Centro Nacional de Alto Rendimiento Deportivo in Buenos Aires, Argentina from 25 May to 26 May 2006.

Medal overview

Men's events

Women's events

Medals table

Notes

External links
 
 PJU (Official results)

American Championships
Judo
2006
 Sports competitions in Buenos Aires
J